The technology of computer keyboards includes many elements. Among the more important of these is the switch technology that they use. Computer alphanumeric keyboards typically have 80 to 110 durable switches, generally one for each key. The choice of switch technology affects key response (the positive feedback that a key has been pressed) and pre-travel (the distance needed to push the key to enter a character reliably). Virtual keyboards on touch screens have no physical switches and provide audio and haptic feedback instead. Some newer keyboard models use hybrids of various technologies to achieve greater cost savings or better ergonomics.

The modern keyboard also includes a control processor and indicator lights to provide feedback to the user (and to the central processor) about what state the keyboard is in. Plug and play technology means that its 'out of the box' layout can be notified to the system, making the keyboard immediately ready to use without need for further configuration unless the user so desires.

Types

Membrane keyboard 

There are two types of membrane-based keyboards, flat-panel membrane keyboards and full-travel membrane keyboards:

Flat-panel membrane keyboards are most often found on appliances like microwave ovens or photocopiers. A common design consists of three layers. The top layer has the labels printed on its front and conductive stripes printed on the back. Under this it has a spacer layer, which holds the front and back layer apart so that they do not normally make electrical contact. The back layer has conductive stripes printed perpendicularly to those of the front layer. When placed together, the stripes form a grid. When the user pushes down at a particular position, their finger pushes the front layer down through the spacer layer to close a circuit at one of the intersections of the grid. This indicates to the computer or keyboard control processor that a particular button has been pressed.

Generally, flat-panel membrane keyboards do not produce a noticeable physical feedback. Therefore, devices using these issue a beep or flash a light when the key is pressed. They are often used in harsh environments where water- or leak-proofing is desirable. Although used in the early days of the personal computer (on the Sinclair ZX80, ZX81 and Atari 400), they have been supplanted by the more tactile dome and mechanical switch keyboards.

Full-travel membrane-based keyboards are the most common computer keyboards today. They have one-piece plastic keytop/switch plungers which press down on a membrane to actuate a contact in an electrical switch matrix.

Dome-switch keyboard 

Dome-switch keyboards are a hybrid of flat-panel membrane and mechanical-switch keyboards. They bring two circuit board traces together under a rubber or silicone keypad using either metal "dome" switches or polyurethane formed domes. The metal dome switches are formed pieces of stainless steel that, when compressed, give the user a crisp, positive tactile feedback. These metal types of dome switches are very common, are usually reliable to over 5 million cycles, and can be plated in either nickel, silver or gold. The rubber dome switches, most commonly referred to as polydomes, are formed polyurethane domes where the inside bubble is coated in graphite. While polydomes are typically cheaper than metal domes, they lack the crisp snap of the metal domes, and usually have a lower life specification. Polydomes are considered very quiet, but purists tend to find them "mushy" because the collapsing dome does not provide as much positive response as metal domes. For either metal or polydomes, when a key is pressed, it collapses the dome, which connects the two circuit traces and completes the connection to enter the character. The pattern on the PC board is often gold-plated.

Both are common switch technologies used in mass market keyboards today. This type of switch technology happens to be most commonly used in handheld controllers, mobile phones, automotive, consumer electronics and medical devices. Dome-switch keyboards are also called direct-switch keyboards.

Scissor-switch keyboard 

A special case of the computer keyboard dome-switch is the scissor-switch. The keys are attached to the keyboard via two plastic pieces that interlock in a "scissor"-like fashion, and snap to the keyboard and the key. It still uses rubber domes, but a special plastic 'scissors' mechanism links the keycap to a plunger that depresses the rubber dome with a much shorter travel than the typical rubber dome keyboard. Typically scissor-switch keyboards also employ 3-layer membranes as the electrical component of the switch. They also usually have a shorter total key travel distance (2 mm instead of 3.5–4 mm for standard dome-switch keyswitches). This type of keyswitch is often found on the built-in keyboards on laptops and keyboards marketed as 'low-profile'. These keyboards are generally quiet and the keys require little force to press.

Scissor-switch keyboards are typically slightly more expensive. They are harder to clean (due to the limited movement of the keys and their multiple attachment points) but also less likely to get debris in them as the gaps between the keys are often smaller (as there is no need for extra room to allow for the 'wiggle' in the key, as typically found on a membrane keyboard).

Capacitive keyboard 

In this type of keyboard, pressing a key changes the capacitance of a pattern of capacitor pads. The pattern consists of two D-shaped capacitor pads for each switch, printed on a printed circuit board (PCB) and covered by a thin, insulating film of soldermask which acts as a dielectric.

Despite the sophistication of the concept, the mechanism of capacitive switching is physically simple. The movable part ends with a flat foam element about the size of an aspirin tablet, finished with aluminum foil. Opposite the switch is a PCB with the capacitor pads. When the key is pressed, the foil tightly clings to the surface of the PCB, forming a daisy chain of two capacitors between contact pads and itself separated with thin soldermask, and thus "shorting" the contact pads with an easily detectable drop of capacitive reactance between them. Usually this permits a pulse or pulse train to be sensed. Because the switch does not have an actual electrical contact, there is no debouncing necessary. The keys do not need to be fully pressed to be actuated, which enables some people to type faster. The sensor tells enough about the position of the key to allow the user to adjust the actuation point (key sensitivity). This adjustment can be done with the help of the bundled software and individually for each key, if so implemented.

The IBM Model F keyboard is mechanical-key design consisted of a buckling spring over a capacitive PCB, similarly to the later Model M keyboard that used a membrane in place of the PCB.

The Topre Corporation design for key switches uses a spring below a rubber dome. The dome provides most of the force that keeps the key from being pressed, similar to a membrane keyboard, while the spring helps with the capacitive action.

Mechanical-switch keyboard 

Every key on a mechanical-switch keyboard contains a complete switch underneath. Each switch is composed of a housing, a spring, and a stem, and sometimes other parts such as a separate tactile leaf or a clickbar. Switches come in three variants: "linear" with consistent resistance, "tactile" with a non-audible bump, and "clicky" with both a bump and an audible click. Depending on the resistance of the spring, the key requires different amounts of pressure to actuate and to bottom out. The shape of the stem as well as the design of the switch housing varies the actuation distance and travel distance of the switch. The sound can be altered by the material of the plate, case, lubrication, the keycap profile, and even modifying the individual switch. These modifications, or "mods" include applying lubricant to reduce friction inside the switch itself, inserting "switch films" to reduce wobble, swapping out the spring inside to modify the resistance of the switch itself and many more. Mechanical keyboards allow for the removal and replacement of keycaps with a common stem type.

Alongside the mechanical keyboard switch is the stabilizer, which supports longer keys such as the "spacebar", "enter", "backspace", and "shift" keys. Although these are not as diverse as switches, they come in different sizes. These different sizes are designed for keyboards that are longer than normal. Similar to a mechanical keyboard switch, the stabilizer can be modified to alter the sound and feel of these certain keys. Lubricant can be used to reduce the rattle of the metal wire that makes up a stabilizer. Furthermore, implementing padding in the "housing" of the stabilizer will lessen rattle and improve acoustics. 

Mechanical keyboards typically have a longer lifespan than membrane or dome-switch keyboards.

A major producer of mechanical switches is Cherry, who has manufactured the MX family of switches since the 1980s. Cherry's color-coding system of categorizing switches has been imitated by other mechanical switch manufacturers, such as Gateron and Kailh among many others.

Hot-swappable keyboard 

Hot-swappable keyboards are keyboards where switches can be pulled out and replaced rather than requiring the typical solder connection. Instead of the switch being soldered to the keyboard's PCB, hot-swap sockets are instead soldered on. They are mostly used by keyboard enthusiasts that build custom keyboards, and have recently begun being adopted by larger companies on production keyboards. Hot-swap sockets typically cost anywhere from $10–25 USD  to fill a complete board and can allow users to try a variety of different switches without having the tools or knowledge required to solder electronics.

Buckling-spring keyboard 

Many typists prefer buckling spring keyboards. The buckling spring mechanism (expired ) atop the switch is responsible for the tactile and aural response of the keyboard. This mechanism controls a small hammer that strikes a capacitive or membrane switch.

In 1993, two years after spawning Lexmark, IBM transferred its keyboard operations to the daughter company. New Model M keyboards continued to be manufactured for IBM by Lexmark until 1996, when Unicomp was established and purchased the keyboard patents and tooling equipment to continue their production.

IBM continued to make Model M's in their Scotland factory until 1999.

Hall-effect keyboard 
Hall effect keyboards use magnets and Hall effect sensors instead of switches with mechanical contacts. When a key is depressed, it moves a magnet that is detected by a solid-state sensor. Because they require no physical contact for actuation, Hall-effect keyboards are extremely reliable and can accept millions of keystrokes before failing. They are used for ultra-high reliability applications such as nuclear power plants, aircraft cockpits, and critical industrial environments. They can easily be made totally waterproof, and can resist large amounts of dust and contaminants. Because a magnet and sensor are required for each key, as well as custom control electronics, they are expensive to manufacture.

A hall switch works through magnetic fields. Every switch has a small magnet fixed inside it. When the electricity passes through the main circuit, it creates a magnetic flux. So, every time you press a key, the magnetic intensity changes. This change is noted by the circuit and the sensors send the information to the motherboard.

Laser projection keyboard 

A laser projection device approximately the size of a computer mouse projects the outline of keyboard keys onto a flat surface, such as a table or desk. This type of keyboard is portable enough to be easily used with PDAs and cellphones, and many models have retractable cords and wireless capabilities. However, sudden or accidental disruption of the laser will register unwanted keystrokes. Also, if the laser malfunctions, the whole unit becomes useless, unlike conventional keyboards which can be used even if a variety of parts (such as the keycaps) are removed. This type of keyboard can be frustrating to use since it is susceptible to errors, even in the course of normal typing, and its complete lack of tactile feedback makes it even less user-friendly than the lowest quality membrane keyboards.

Roll-up keyboard 

Keyboards made of flexible silicone or polyurethane materials can roll up in a bundle. Tightly folding the keyboard may damage the internal membrane circuits. When they are completely sealed in rubber, they are water resistant. Roll-up keyboards provide relatively little tactile feedback, and silicone will tend to attract dirt, dust, and hair.

Optical keyboard technology 
Also known as photo-optical keyboard, light responsive keyboard, photo-electric keyboard, and optical key actuation detection technology.

Optical keyboard technology was introduced in 1962 by Harley E. Kelchner for use in a typewriter machine with the purpose of reducing the noise generating by actuating the typewriter keys.

An optical keyboard technology utilizes light-emitting devices and photo sensors to optically detect actuated keys. Most commonly the emitters and sensors are located at the perimeter, mounted on a small PCB. The light is directed from side to side of the keyboard interior, and it can only be blocked by the actuated keys. Most optical keyboards require at least two beams (most commonly a vertical beam and a horizontal beam) to determine the actuated key. Some optical keyboards use a special key structure that blocks the light in a certain pattern, allowing only one beam per row of keys (most commonly a horizontal beam).

The mechanism of the optical keyboard is very simple – a light beam is sent from the emitter to the receiving sensor, and the actuated key blocks, reflects, refracts or otherwise interacts with the beam, resulting in an identified key.

Some earlier optical keyboards were limited in their structure and required special casing to block external light, no multi-key functionality was supported and the design was very limited to a thick rectangular case.

The advantages of optical keyboard technology are that it offers a real waterproof keyboard, resilient to dust and liquids; and it uses about 20% PCB volume, compared with membrane or dome switch keyboards, significantly reducing electronic waste.
Additional advantages of optical keyboard technology over other keyboard technologies such as Hall effect, laser, roll-up, and transparent keyboards lie in cost (Hall effect keyboard) and feel – optical keyboard technology does not require different key mechanisms, and the tactile feel of typing has remained the same for over 60 years.

The specialist DataHand keyboard uses optical technology to sense keypresses with a single light beam and sensor per key. The keys are held in their rest position by magnets; when the magnetic force is overcome to press a key, the optical path is unblocked and the keypress is registered.

Debouncing 

When a key is pressed, it oscillates (bounces) against its contacts several times before settling. When released, it oscillates again until it comes to rest. Although it happens on a scale too small to be visible to the naked eye, it can be enough to register multiple keystrokes.

To resolve this, the processor in a keyboard debounces the keystrokes, by averaging the signal over time to produce one "confirmed" keystroke that (usually) corresponds to a single press or release. Early membrane keyboards had limited typing speed because they had to do significant debouncing. This was a noticeable problem on the ZX81.

Keycaps 
Keycaps are used on full-travel keyboards. While modern keycaps are typically surface-printed, they can also be double-shot molded, laser printed, sublimation printed, engraved, or they can be made of transparent material with printed paper inserts.

There are also keycaps which are thin shells that are placed over key bases. These were used on IBM PC keyboards.

Other parts  
The modern PC keyboard also includes a control processor and indicator lights to provide feedback to the user about what state the keyboard is in. Depending on the sophistication of the controller's programming, the keyboard may also offer other special features. The processor is usually a single chip 8048 microcontroller variant. The keyboard switch matrix is wired to its inputs and it processes the incoming keystrokes and sends the results down a serial cable (the keyboard cord) to a receiver in the main computer box. It also controls the illumination of the "caps lock", "num lock" and "scroll lock" lights.

A common test for whether the computer has crashed is pressing the "caps lock" key. The keyboard sends the key code to the keyboard driver running in the main computer; if the main computer is operating, it commands the light to turn on. All the other indicator lights work in a similar way. The keyboard driver also tracks the shift, alt and control state of the keyboard.

Keyboard switch matrix 

The keyboard switch matrix is often drawn with horizontal wires and vertical wires in a grid which is called a matrix circuit. It has a switch at some or all intersections, much like a multiplexed display.

Ghost keys 
Almost all keyboards have only the switch (but no diode) at each intersection, which causes "ghost keys" and "key jamming" when multiple keys are pressed (rollover). Certain, often more expensive, keyboards have a diode between each intersection, allowing the keyboard microcontroller to accurately sense any number of simultaneous keys being pressed, without generating erroneous ghost keys.

Alternative text-entering methods 

Optical character recognition (OCR) is preferable to rekeying for converting existing text that is already written down but not in machine-readable format (for example, a Linotype-composed book from the 1940s). In other words, to convert the text from an image to editable text (that is, a string of character codes), a person could re-type it, or a computer could look at the image and deduce what each character is. OCR technology has already reached an impressive state (for example, Google Book Search) and promises more for the future.

Speech recognition converts speech into machine-readable text (that is, a string of character codes). This technology has also reached an advanced state and is implemented in various software products. For certain uses (e.g., transcription of medical or legal dictation; journalism; writing essays or novels) speech recognition is starting to replace the keyboard.  However, the lack of privacy when issuing voice commands and dictation makes this kind of input unsuitable for many environments.

Pointing devices can be used to enter text or characters in contexts where using a physical keyboard would be inappropriate or impossible. These accessories typically present characters on a display, in a layout that provides fast access to the more frequently used characters or character combinations. Popular examples of this kind of input are Graffiti, Dasher and on-screen virtual keyboards.

Other issues

Keystroke logging 
Unencrypted Bluetooth keyboards are known to be vulnerable to signal theft for keylogging by other Bluetooth devices in range. Microsoft wireless keyboards 2011 and earlier are documented to have this vulnerability.

Keystroke logging (often called keylogging) is a method of capturing and recording user keystrokes. While it can be used legally to measure employee activity, or by law enforcement agencies to investigate suspicious activities, it is also used by hackers for illegal or malicious acts. Hackers use keyloggers to obtain passwords or encryption keys.

Keystroke logging can be achieved by both hardware and software means. Hardware key loggers are attached to the keyboard cable or installed inside standard keyboards. Software keyloggers work on the target computer's operating system and gain unauthorized access to the hardware, hook into the keyboard with functions provided by the OS, or use remote access software to transmit recorded data out of the target computer to a remote location. Some hackers also use wireless keylogger sniffers to collect packets of data being transferred from a wireless keyboard and its receiver, and then they crack the encryption key being used to secure wireless communications between the two devices.

Anti-spyware applications are able to detect many keyloggers and remove them. Responsible vendors of monitoring software support detection by anti-spyware programs, thus preventing abuse of the software. Enabling a firewall does not stop keyloggers per se, but can possibly prevent transmission of the logged material over the net if properly configured. Network monitors (also known as reverse-firewalls) can be used to alert the user whenever an application attempts to make a network connection. This gives the user the chance to prevent the keylogger from "phoning home" with his or her typed information. Automatic form-filling programs can prevent keylogging entirely by not using the keyboard at all. Most keyloggers can be fooled by alternating between typing the login credentials and typing characters somewhere else in the focus window.

Keyboards are also known to emit electromagnetic signatures that can be detected using special spying equipment to reconstruct the keys pressed on the keyboard. Neal O'Farrell, executive director of the Identity Theft Council, revealed to InformationWeek that "More than 25 years ago, a couple of former spooks showed me how they could capture a user's ATM PIN, from a van parked across the street, simply by capturing and decoding the electromagnetic signals generated by every keystroke," O'Farrell said. "They could even capture keystrokes from computers in nearby offices, but the technology wasn't sophisticated enough to focus in on any specific computer."

Physical injury 

The use of any keyboard may cause serious injury (such as carpal tunnel syndrome or other repetitive strain injuries) to the hands, wrists, arms, neck or back. The risks of injuries can be reduced by taking frequent short breaks to get up and walk around a couple of times every hour. Users should also vary tasks throughout the day, to avoid overuse of the hands and wrists. When typing on a keyboard, a person should keep the shoulders relaxed with the elbows at the side, with the keyboard and mouse positioned so that reaching is not necessary. The chair height and keyboard tray should be adjusted so that the wrists are straight, and the wrists should not be rested on sharp table edges. Wrist or palm rests should not be used while typing.

Some adaptive technology ranging from special keyboards, mouse replacements and pen tablet interfaces to speech recognition software can reduce the risk of injury. Pause software reminds the user to pause frequently. Switching to a much more ergonomic mouse, such as a vertical mouse or joystick mouse may provide relief.

By using a touchpad or a stylus pen with a graphic tablet, in place of a mouse, one can lessen the repetitive strain on the arms and hands.

See also 
List of mechanical keyboards
Keyboard layout
AZERTY
QWERTY
QWERTZ
 Keyboard mapping

References 

Computer keyboards